K. V. Sumesh is an Indian politician of CPIM serving as the MLA of Azhikode Constituency since May 2021. He defeated sitting MLA K. M. Shaji by a vote margin of 6141 votes. He is also CPIM Kannur District Member, former Kannur district panchayat President.

References 

Kerala MLAs 2021–2026
Communist Party of India (Marxist) politicians from Kerala
Year of birth missing (living people)
Living people